The second season of the Black Clover anime TV series was directed by Tatsuya Yoshihara and produced by Pierrot. The season adapts Yūki Tabata's manga series of the same name from the rest of the 9th volume to the 17th volume (chapters 76–159), with the exception of episodes 55 and 56 (which adapt Tabata and Johnny Onda's light novel, The Book of the Black Bulls), episode 66 (recap), episode 82 (Petit Clover filler), and episodes 85 and 86 (filler). The first 14 episodes (episodes 52–65) focus on the Black Bulls as they enter the Forest of Witches and help heal Asta's arms, which were injured from his battle with the Eye of the Midnight Sun.

The season initially ran from October 2, 2018 to September 24, 2019 on TV Tokyo in Japan, and was released in five DVD and Blu-ray compilations, each consisting of eight to eleven episodes, by Avex Pictures between April 26, 2019 and January 31, 2020. Both Crunchyroll and Funimation licensed the series for an English release, with Crunchyroll simulcast the second season, and Funimation producing a North American Simuldub. Funimation's adaptation aired from January 13, 2019 to January 26, 2020 on Adult Swim's Toonami programming block.

The second season uses eight pieces of theme music: four opening themes and four ending themes. The fourth opening theme used for episodes 95 to 102 is "Sky & Blue" by Girlfriend and the ending theme used for episodes 90 to 102 is "Against All Gods" by M-Flo.


Episode list

Home media release

Japanese
In Japan, Avex Pictures released the second season of the anime on DVD and Blu-ray in five "chapter" volumes, with the sixth volume released on April 6, 2019, and the tenth volume released on January 31, 2020.

English
In North America, Crunchyroll & Funimation released the series on Blu-ray and DVD combination sets. The first volume was released on October 1, 2019, and the fifth and final volume of the season released on June 30, 2020. The third and fifth volumes were also released in limited edition sets. Funimation also distributes the series in Australia and New Zealand via Madman Entertainment, and via Manga Entertainment in the United Kingdom and Ireland.

Notes

References

Black Clover episode lists
2018 Japanese television seasons
2019 Japanese television seasons